The National Federation of Life Insurance Workers' Unions (Seiho Roren) is a trade union representing workers in the life insurance industry in Japan.

The union was founded in 1969, when the National Federation of Life Insurance Brokers' Unions merged with the National Federation of Life Insurance Salesmen's Unions, reflecting the merger of many company unions for brokers and salespeople.  In 1987, it affiliated to the new Japanese Trade Union Confederation, and by the following year, it had 406,000 members.   As of 2020, its membership had fallen to 233,614.

References

External links

Insurance industry trade unions
Trade unions established in 1969
Trade unions in Japan